Louise de Bourbon (2 February 1603 – 9 September 1637) called Mademoiselle de Soissons was the wife of Henri d'Orléans, Duke of Longueville. She was the mother of the famous Marie de Nemours.

Life

The eldest daughter of Charles de Bourbon, Count of Soissons and Anne de Montafié, she was the older sister of the Princess of Carignano as well as the last Count of Soissons. Brought up at the Abbey of Fontevraud, she was placed in the care of her great-aunt Éléonore de Bourbon, one time Princess of Orange.

Mademoiselle de Soissons married Henri II d'Orléans, Duke of Longueville in Paris on 10 April 1617. The newly-weds had ancestors in common, their fathers both grandsons of François d'Orléans, Duke of Fronsac. The couple eventually had three children, only one of which survived infancy. Dying in 1637, her husband married once more, another princess of the blood in the form of Mademoiselle de Bourbon, sister of the grand Condé.

Children

Marie (1625–1707) married Henri II, Duke of Nemours.
Louise (1626-1628).
X (1634-1634).

Ancestry

References

External links 

1603 births
1637 deaths
Princesses of Neuchâtel
Louise
Louise
17th-century French women
Duchesses of Longueville